The 1940 United States presidential election in Wisconsin was held on November 5, 1940 as part of the 1940 United States presidential election. State voters chose 12 electors to the Electoral College, who voted for president and vice president.

Background
Politics in Wisconsin since the Populist movement had been dominated by the Republican Party. The Democratic Party had been uncompetitive outside certain eastern German areas, as the upper classes, along with the majority of workers who followed them, fled from William Jennings Bryan’s agrarian and free silver sympathies. Although the state did develop a strong Socialist Party to provide opposition to the GOP, Wisconsin developed the direct Republican primary in 1903 and this ultimately created competition between the “League” under Robert M. La Follette, and the conservative “Regular” faction. This ultimately would develop into the Wisconsin Progressive Party in the late 1930s, which was opposed to the conservative German Democrats and to the national Republican Party, and allied with Franklin D. Roosevelt at the federal level.

In 1936, despite continuing Democratic gains in industrial and urban areas, German Catholic areas of Wisconsin gave substantial support to Union Party candidate William Lemke due to his support for rigid isolationism. When the next presidential election came, the Progressive Party had lost ground in 1938 but World War II had divided the country deeply on ethnic lines. Germans – especially German Catholics – and Irish Catholics believed Communism in the shape of Stalinist Russia was a much greater danger to the United States than Nazism and that the United States should not aid Britain and France, whereas the British and French, bound by ties to their homeland, were strongly in favor of such aid.

Vote
Republican nominee Willkie visited Wisconsin in his campaign in September, saying change was needed to make the American political system work. By late September opinion polls suggested he had the edge over Roosevelt in the state. Even as some other states of the Midwest moved towards President Roosevelt, Wisconsin was still seen as likely to go to Willkie as Senator Robert M. La Follette Jr. strongly opposed war aid to Britain and France. A Gallup poll four days before voting showed Willkie still ahead but falling.

In the end, however, unlike in Iowa, Michigan and Indiana, Roosevelt’s gains proved enough to pass Willkie, and he carried Wisconsin, although by a massively reduced margin compared to 1932 and 1936. Whereas Alf Landon had carried only four of Wisconsin’s seventy-one counties, Willkie carried forty-two. Most significantly, Willkie established the historically German “WOW counties” surrounding Milwaukee as reliable GOP strongholds that as of 2020 have not voted Democratic since except during Lyndon B. Johnson's landslide in 1964. Roosevelt’s win was due to his seventy-eight-thousand vote plurality in Milwaukee County, and to maintaining his strength in the unionized, Scaniavian-American northwest.

This is the fourth most recent election in which Wisconsin voted for a different candidate than neighboring Iowa, a phenomenon that has only been repeated three times since - in 1976, 2004, and 2020.

Results

Results by county

See also
 United States presidential elections in Wisconsin

References

Wisconsin
1940
1940 Wisconsin elections